The mission of a United States Air Force electronic warfare squadron is to use the electromagnetic spectrum (EM spectrum) to attack an enemy, or impede enemy actions by denying the use of the EM spectrum, whilst ensuring friendly forces free access to it. Electronic warfare can target humans, communication, radar, or other assets (military and civilian). This list contains squadrons inactive, active, and historical.

List

See also
 List of United States Air Force squadrons
 List of United States Air Force electronic combat squadrons

Electronic warfare